"Until the End" is a song by American rock band Breaking Benjamin. It was released in October 2007 as the third single from their third album, Phobia. On February 11, 2014, "Until the End" was certified gold by the RIAA, which made the single the first certified song by the band. Since then, the band have been awarded with six gold, three platinum, and three multi-platinum singles.

Release
The song was posted on Breaking Benjamin's Myspace page and said to be a future single on July 10, 2007; its release was announced that same night on The Shallow Bay Radio, Breaking Benjamin's online radio station. The original date was for July 10, 2007, but was moved to October 2. Rhiannon Napier, former girlfriend and ex-wife of Benjamin's, appeared in the music video, where she drowned to the dark tub, to the land of phobia angels staying awake walking in a off-shoulder gothic blue dress and then stared in ghost, then she woke up from a drowning death and she went away.

Track listing

Chart performance
The song debuted at number 35 on the Mainstream Rock Tracks chart in its first week after being released and peaked at number six on that chart. On the Modern Rock chart, the song debuted at number 38 and eventually peaked at number 21 there.

Charts

In the media
"Until the End" was used as a background on the December 18, 2007 broadcast of WWE SmackDown, showcasing the fight between Randy Orton, John Cena and Triple H at WrestleMania XXIV.
The song is featured as a downloadable content part of the Breaking Benjamin track pack in that is released in Guitar Hero 5.

Certifications

References

Breaking Benjamin songs
2007 singles
Hollywood Records singles
Songs written by Aaron Fincke
Songs written by Benjamin Burnley
2007 songs